Saraguru may refer to:

Saragur, Mysore district, Karnataka, India
Saragooru Nanjangud, Mysore district, Karnataka, India